Kanoon is a 1994 Indian Hindi-language film directed and produced by Sushma Shiromani under her own productions Shiromani Chitra and starring Ajay Devgan, Urmila Matondkar in lead roles.

Cast 
Ajay Devgn as Vishal 
Urmila Matondkar as Shalu
Kiran Kumar as Police Commissioner Kiran Shroff
Prem Chopra as Advocate Dhananjay
Gulshan Grover as Raja Thakur
Aloknath as Judge Dharmadhikari
Asha Sharma as Mrs. Dharmadhikari
Arun Govil as Pankaj
Reema Lagoo as Mrs. Pankaj
Ajay Nagrath as Ravi 
Yunus Parvez as Jailor
Johnny Lever as Lakhiya
Ishrat Ali as Chaturvedi
Sudhir Dalvi as Public Prosecutor
Bharat Kapoor as Inspector Desai

Soundtrack
Soundtrack is available on Tips Music. Background Score is by Shyam-Surender. The lyricists are Maya Govind, Faiz Anwar and Rani Malik.

References

External links 

1990s Hindi-language films